Union of Parishes of Alvega e Concavada is a freguesia ("parish") in the municipality of Abrantes, Portugal. It was formed in 2013 by the merger of the former parishes Alvega and Concavada. The population in 2011 was 2,152, in an area of 75.85 km².

References

Freguesias of Abrantes